Peter Svensson (born 6 January 1961) is a former professional tennis player from Sweden.

Biography
Svensson received a tennis scholarship to attend the University of Arkansas at Little Rock, after which he completed an MBA at the University of Texas at Tyler.

Most of his top level tour matches were in doubles, in which he was ranked as high as 77 in the world. He had his best year in 1985 when he made the semi-finals of five Grand Prix tournaments. During his career he won a total of seven Challenger doubles titles.

As a singles player he reached two Challenger finals and competed in the 1988 Swedish Open, held in Bastad. He defeated Branislav Stankovič in the first round, then lost in the second round to Niclas Kroon. 

One of his doubles partners was Stefan Edberg, who he teamed up with at Basel in both 1988 and 1989. 

His only Grand Slam appearance came at the 1990 Australian Open where he teamed up with Ronnie Båthman.

He now lives in Switzerland and is an executive with Nestlé. Two sons, Filip and Viktor, played collegiate tennis in the United States.

Challenger titles

Doubles: (7)

References

External links
 
 

1961 births
Living people
Swedish male tennis players
People from Ängelholm Municipality
University of Arkansas at Little Rock alumni
University of Texas at Tyler alumni
Swedish business executives
College men's tennis players in the United States